The Whitney–Farrington–Cook House was a historic house in Waltham, Massachusetts.  The -story wood-frame house was built c. 1858, and was a good example of Italianate styling.  It had a three-bay facade, with a single-story porch across the facade which is supported by Tuscan columns.  The main entry was flanked by sidelights and simple pilasters, and topped by an entablature.

The house was listed on the National Register of Historic Places in 1989. It was demolished circa 2012.

See also
National Register of Historic Places listings in Waltham, Massachusetts

References

Houses in Waltham, Massachusetts
Houses on the National Register of Historic Places in Waltham, Massachusetts
Italianate architecture in Massachusetts
Houses completed in 1858
Demolished buildings and structures in Massachusetts